France was the host of the 1900 Summer Olympics in Paris.  France was one of many nations that had competed in the 1896 Summer Olympics in Greece and had returned to compete at the 1900 Games.

Gold medals were not given out and silver medals were given to the winners while bronze medals were given to second place.

Medalists

Archery

France took four of seven gold medals, five of eight silver medals, and four of five bronze medals in the six archery events that were Olympic. Belgium and the Netherlands were the only others nation that competed, taking the remaining seven medals. Many of the French, Belgian, and Dutch competitors are unknown as their names were not recorded. 13 French archers are known by at least their surname, 116 are unidentified in any way. The 129 archers had 240 entries across all 7 archery events.

Athletics

France was one of 9 nations to have competed at both the first two Olympics in athletics. 22 athletes competed in 18 events, with a total of 28 entries. France won its first Olympic championship in the sport, though that victory's belonging to France is disputed. Michel Théato was Luxembourgish but living in Paris; his win in the marathon was initially credited to France by the International Olympic Committee, however currently International Olympic Committee attributes his medal to Luxembourg. Without Théato's gold medal, France won a total of 6 medals in the sport and ranked 3rd in the leaderboard for athletics.

Track & road events

Field events

Basque pelota

France sent one of two teams that competed in the pelota tournament. According to some sources, French two-man team lost to Spain's team, taking the silver medal. However, the French team withdrew shortly before the competition. International Olympic Committee does not recognize silver medal of French team.

Cricket

France was represented by the French Athletic Club Union in cricket in 1900.  The team lost the only match, a 2-day 12-man contest, by 158 runs. At least 11 members of the French Athletic Club Union were British nationals, two of whom were born in France; another, H. F. Roques, as well those shown on the scoresheet as “extras”, may have been French.

Croquet

France was the only nation to compete in croquet. France sent 6 men and 3 women. The French players won all 7 medals in the three events.

One ball

Two balls

Doubles

Cycling

France competed a second time in cycling, once again dominating the field.  Of the nine medals awarded in the event, French cyclists took six—two of each type.  59 French cyclists competed.

Sprint

25 km

Points race

Equestrian

Jumping

High jump

Long jump

Hacks and hunter combined

Four-in-hand (mail coach)

Fencing

France dominated the fencing competitions at the second modern Olympics, taking five of the seven gold medals and 15 of the 21 overall medals.

Football

Club Française represented France in the football competition.  The club squad lost to Upton Park F.C. but defeated the Université de Bruxelles team to take second place in the three-team competition.

 Summary

 Match 1

 Match 2

Golf

France was one of four nations to compete in the first Olympic golf events.

Gymnastics

France's first Olympic gymnastics medals came in the second edition of the competitions.  France took all three medals in the single combined event.  108 of the 135 entrants in the event were French.

Polo

France was one of four nations to compete in the first Olympic polo event. Frenchmen played on two of the five teams, one of which also included British players. The mixed French/British Mixed team was one of the third-place teams.

Rowing

47 French rowers competed in the first Olympic rowing competitions in 1900. France won 2 of the 5 gold medals, and a French boy served as cox in the final for the otherwise Dutch team that won the coxed pair. France also won 3 silver medals and 1 bronze.

Rugby

French team Union des Sociétés Français de Sports Athletiques was one of three teams to compete in the first Olympic rugby games. They won both of its games, taking top prize in the tournament. This gold medal is attributed to Mixed team because of Constantin Henriquez was from Haiti and Andre Roosevelt was a French-born citizen of USA.

 Summary

 Match 1

 Match 2

Sailing

France matched Great Britain in gold medals won in the inaugural sailing events in 1900, but took 16 of the 20 silver and bronze medals (8 each).  76 French sailors took part.

 Single race events

 Regatta events

Shooting

France competed again in shooting at the second modern Olympic Games. France won the most medals in the sport that year with 10, but took only three gold medals to Switzerland's five. Men's 20 metre rapid fire pistol event was open to professionals and was contested for prize money by professionals, that is why it is not recognized by the International Olympic Committee as Olympic medal event.

Swimming

France had 47 swimmers compete in 1900, the nation's first appearance in the sport. France took a total of 5 medals in the sport, but only 1 gold (putting France in 4th on the leaderboard, after Great Britain, Australia, and Germany who each had 2 championships). Charles Devendeville and André Six finished first and second in the underwater swimming competition, held only in 1900; they appear to have benefitted from the third-place finisher swimming in a circle. France had 3 of the 4 teams in the team swimming event, taking 2nd, 3rd, and 4th.

Tennis

France competed in tennis for the second time in 1900, sending 14 players—10 men and 4 women. French players appeared in 3 of the 4 finals (Hélène Prévost in the women's singles, and as part of mixed teams with Great Britain in both the men's and mixed doubles) but lost each time. France took an additional bronze medal in the men's doubles.

Tug of war

France sent a team to compete in the tug of war competition in 1900, losing to a combined Denmark-Sweden team. This silver medal is attributed to Mixed team, because of Francisco Henríquez de Zubiría was born in Colombia and was a Colombian citizen.

Water polo

France had 4 of the 7 teams in the first Olympic water polo tournament. Two were defeated in the quarterfinals, with only one winning a match there and the other advancing with a bye. Both of the remaining teams were defeated in the semifinals, taking bronze medals. The bronze medal of Libellule de Paris team is attributed to Mixed team, because of Bill Burgess was from Great Britain. France thus received 1 bronze medals despite going 1–4 combined.

Notes

Nations at the 1900 Summer Olympics
1900
Olympics